Granot Central Cooperative Ltd. is a purchasing organization of the kibbutz movement in Israel. 

With an annual revenue of about 3.5 billion NIS, Granot was recognized in 2007 as one of the largest cooperatives in the world (based on a research by the International Co-operative Alliance).

History
Granot was established in 1940 in order to utilize economics of scale both in marketing agricultural products and reducing purchasing prices of goods for the member farms. Uniting the farms into one big cooperative, made it possible to use expansive technologies for processing agricultural products. To this day, this advantage helps to reduce costs and finance operating capital necessary to sustain the agricultural farms.

Operations
The chairman is Amit Ben Itzhak, who has held the position since 2014. Roberto Kuperman serves as Chief Executive Officer since 2005.

Granot oversees 20 factories and companies owned by 43 kibbutzim in Israel's coastal and central region. It operates in a wide range of economic sectors: finances, holdings, purchasing, agriculture (avocado, citrus fruits, cowsheds, poultry), industry (feed mills, food, slaughter houses, seed technologies development, refrigerated storage), infrastructures, energy,  information technologies, real estate, labor recruitment, transportation, on-job professional training and more.

Granot corporations
Ambar Feed Mills - Operates the largest and most advanced animal feed mills in Israel, one in Gan Shmuel (Ambar North) and another in Dvira (Ambar South). Total annual production is nearly one million tons of compound feed.
Granot Avocado & Citrus Cooperative -  Cooperate kibbutzim which produce one third of the total Israeli avocado yield and citrus.  Granot Avocado & Citrus Cooperative owns the largest Avocado packing house in Israel.

Holdings
 100% of Mey-Ram Water Ltd., the leading private company in Israel, dealing with management of water and electricity resources in the Israeli rural sector.
 66% of Rimon Ltd. deals with entrepreneurship and execution of projects in the field of recycled water.
 7.5% of Tnuva Ltd., the leading food company in Israel. (Together with other Kibbutzim organizations holds 23.5% of the company)

References

External links
 Official website
 Ambar
 Rimon Ltd.

Agricultural cooperatives
Agricultural organizations based in Israel
Agricultural Union
Cooperatives in Israel